South Edmonton Common is one of Canada's largest retail power centres, and when it will be completely developed, it will spread over  and contain some  of retail space, making it one of the largest open-air retail development in North America. The Common is located in south Edmonton, Alberta, extending from 23rd Avenue south to Anthony Henday Drive, and east from Gateway Boulevard to Parsons Road.

The Common has a large base of retail tenants that provide various goods and services. The first tenant in the Commons was The Home Depot, which opened in April 1998. Anchor tenants at South Edmonton Common include Canadian Tire (the chain's largest location), IKEA, Cineplex Cinemas, Lowe's, Real Canadian Superstore, and Walmart. Other stores include Staples, Best Buy, Marshalls, Lindt, Mountain Equipment Co-op, Nordstrom Rack, and Canada's first buybuy BABY.

Store openings and closures

Compusmart
Hartco Income Fund, the company that owns Compusmart, began shutting down its 15 Compusmart locations in May 2007. Originally, the South Edmonton Common location was not one of the first five to be shut down; however, it was quickly sold as well. As of January 2017, the location is currently occupied by Party City.

Old Walmart Of South Common
Walmart initially opened in 1998 where as one of the first two retailers to open in South Common, the other being The Home Depot. It relocated from its former location in the nearby Heritage Mall.

On November 7, 2007, the newest Walmart Supercentre opened on the south end of South Edmonton Common, replacing the former retail location at Parsons Road and 21 Avenue. Konto Furniture, Sofa Land, Bed Bath & Beyond and buybuy BABY now share the space of the former Walmart.

The Walmart Supercentre has a full indoor garden centre, a fully serviced grocery store including meat, produce, bakery and floral. All former services such as McDonald's, optometrists, photo finishing and portrait studio are available at the new location, along with a Tim Hortons located in the building, which brings a total of three Tim Hortons locations to South Edmonton Common.

Walmart is the only tenant of the shopping centre that is east of Parsons Road.

Future Shop
The location featured a larger, 53,000 square-foot layout and an updated store concept. The store, along with 65 other Future Shop stores, closed on March 28, 2015. and in August 2015, Spirit Halloween took the spot for 2 months, then leaving one anchor tenant vacant. Sport Chek, which opened in fall 2016, replaced Future Shop.

Anchors
 Canadian Tire - opened 2016
 Cineplex Odeon - opened 2000
 IKEA
 Lowe's
 Real Canadian Superstore
 The Home Depot
 Walmart - opened 2007

Junior Anchors
 Ashley Furniture
 Bed, Bath, & Beyond
 Best Buy
 Bulk Barn - formerly A Buck or Two
 buybuy BABY
 Dollarama
 Gap
 Golf Town
 H&M
 HomeSense
 Indigo
 La-Z-Boy
 London Drugs
 Mark's
 Marshalls
 MEC - opened 2016, formerly Sears Home
 Michaels
 Nordstrom Rack - opened 2018
 Old Navy
 PartSource
 Party City - formerly Compusmart
 Planet Fitness - opened 2022
 Running Room
 Sport Chek - opened 2016, formerly Future Shop
 Staples
 The Brick
 The Rec Room
 Urban Planet

Former anchors
 A Buck or Two - now Bulk Barn
 Compusmart - now Party City
 Future Shop - closed 2015, now Sport Chek
 Home Outfitters - closed 2019, now Planet Fitness
 Pier 1 Imports - closed 2020, now Dollar Tree
 Sears Home - closed 2015, now MEC
 Wholesale Sports

References

External links
South Edmonton Common Website
Listing of Current Retailers

Power centres (retail) in Canada
1998 establishments in Alberta
Tourist attractions in Edmonton
Shopping districts and streets in Canada